KQUE-FM (88.1 FM) is a radio station broadcasting a Spanish religious format. Licensed to Bay City, Texas, United States, the station is currently owned by Roberto and Ruben Villarreal, through licensee Aleluya Broadcast Network.

References

External links
 

Radio stations established in 1993
1993 establishments in Texas
QUE-FM
QUE-FM
Matagorda County, Texas